Codex Basilensis, designated by Ee, 07 (in the Gregory-Aland numbering) or ε 55 (von Soden), is a Greek uncial manuscript of the four Gospels, dated paleographically to the 8th century.

The manuscript contains marginalia, was adapted for liturgical reading, and contains some lacuna. Three leaves of the codex were overwritten by a later hand; these leaves are considered palimpsests.

Description 
The codex contains an almost complete text of the four Gospels on 318 parchment leaves. The text is written in one column per page, with 23 or more lines per page in uncial letters. The Gospel of Luke contains five small lacunae (1:69-2:4, 3:4-15, 12:58-13:12, 15:8-20, 24:47-end). Three of them were later completed in cursive (1:69-2:4, 12:58-13:12, 15:8-20).

The letters Θ Ε Ο Σ are round, the strokes of Χ Ζ Ξ are not prolonged below the line. It has a regular system of punctuation. The handwriting is similar to that in the Codex Alexandrinus, though not so regular and neat. The initial letters are decorated with green, blue, and vermilion.

The chapters are divided into Ammonian Sections with references to the Eusebian Canons (written below the Ammonian Section numbers), along with harmonising references to other Gospels at the foot of the pages, although full references to all parallel texts are given in the margins and the tables are thus superfluous. The initial letters at the beginning sections stand out on the margin as in codices Alexandrinus and Ephraemi Rescriptus. The page margins also contain the names of Feast days and their lecton references, together with other liturgical notes.

Certain disputed passages are marked with an asterisk – signs of the times (Matthew 16:2b-3), Christ's agony (Luke 22:43-44), Luke 23:34, Pericope Adulterae (John 8:2-11).

The codex was bound with the 12th century minuscule codex 2087, which contains portions of the Book of Revelation. Three leaves of the codex are palimpsests (folio 160, 207, 214) – they were overwritten by a later hand. Folio 207 contains a fragment of Ephraem Syrus in Greek, while the texts of folios 160 and 214 are still unidentified.

Text 

The Greek text of this codex is considered a representative of the Byzantine textual tradition, but with a small number of non-Byzantine readings. The text of the manuscript has been cited in all critical editions of the Greek New Testament, but it is not highly esteemed by scholars. According to textual critics Kurt and Barbara Aland, out of 316 readings tested, it agrees with the Byzantine text-type 209 times against what the Alands consider to be the original text, and 107 times with both the Byzantine and what the Alands consider to be the original text. Only one reading agrees with what the Alands consider to be the original text against the Byzantine. There are 9 independent or distinctive readings. Aland placed its text in Category V.

It belongs to the textual Family E (the early Byzantine text) and is closely related to the Codex Nanianus (U 030), and the Codex Athous Dionysiou (Ω 045). It is probably the oldest manuscript with a pure Byzantine text (with almost a complete text of the Gospels), and it is one of the most important witnesses of the Byzantine text-type.

 Some textual variants

 (and when the centurion returned to the house in that hour, he found the slave well) 
incl. - E  C M N U Θ Uncial 0250 ƒ 33 1241 g syr
omit - Majority of manuscripts

 (he answered, saying) - E 565 700 pm
 (said to him) - Majority of manuscripts

 (Who are you?) - E   157
 (Who are (you)?) - Majority of manuscripts

 (Bethania) - E    B W
 (Bethabara) - Majority of manuscripts

 (the Lord) - E   Majority of manuscripts
 (Jesus) - *  D Θ 086 ƒ 565 1241 lat sy bo

 (one another) - E Δ
 (men) - Majority of manuscripts

 (they heard it, and remorse took them, they went away, one by one) - E G H K S pm
 (they heard it, they went away, one by one) - Majority of manuscripts

 (came) - E    Γ Δ 892s 1424 pm
 (came before me) - Majority of manuscripts

History

Dating 
It is dated by most scholars to the 8th century (Scrivener, Gregory, Nestle, Aland, Metzger). Dean Burgon proposed the 7th century due to the shape of the letters, but the names of Feasts days with their proper lessons and other liturgical markings have been inserted by a later hand. Scrivener dated it to the middle of the 8th century, stating that from the shape of the most of the letters (e.g. pi, delta, xi), it might be judged of even earlier date. According to Guglielmo Cavallo it was written in the early 8th century.

Cataldi Palau suggests it was written at a later date in the 9th century, arguing from the palaeographical point of view it looks older, but the regularity of the accentuation and the abundant colourful decoration are uncharacteristic of the 8th century. The number of errors is remarkably small. According to Palau it was copied by a non-Greek, probably Latin scribe, in 9th century Italy. The Italian location had a strong Byzantine influence.

Location 

It probably was brought to Basel by Cardinal Ragusio (1380–1443), who may have acquired it in Constantinople when he attended the Council of Florence in 1431. In 1559 it was presented to the monastery of the Preaching Friars. In the same year it was transferred to Basel University Library (A. N. III. 12), in Basel (Switzerland), where it is currently housed. It formerly had the shelf-number B VI. 21, but is now K IV. 35.

Use in the Greek New Testament editions 
The codex was available to Erasmus for his translation of the New Testament in Basel, but he never used it. The text of the manuscript was collated by Johann Jakob Wettstein and the manuscript was used by John Mill in his edition of the Greek New Testament. It has been cited in printed editions of the Greek New Testament since the 18th century.

The manuscript is cited in nearly all critical editions of the Greek New Testament (UBS3, UBS4, NA26,). It is never cited in NA27, due to it not being considered a "consistently cited witness of the first order " or "consistently cited witness of the second order".

See also 

 List of New Testament uncials
 Family E
 Biblical manuscript
 Textual criticism

References

Further reading 
 
 
 
 F. Wisse, Family E and the Profile Method, Biblica 51, (1970), pp. 67–75.

External links 

 Robert Waltz, Codex Basilensis E (07): at the Encyclopedia of Textual Criticism.
 

Basilensis
8th-century biblical manuscripts